Lodovico Gallina (25 August 1752 – 4 January 1787) was an Italian painter of the Baroque period, mainly active in Brescia. Born to poor parents in Brescia, he was initially a pupil of Antonio Dusi. Under the patronage of Luigi Chizzola and Faustino Lechi, he was sent to be instructed in the Accademia di Belle Arti in Venice.

He painted an altarpiece depicting Saints Ignatius of Loyola and Fillippo Neri for the church of Acquafredda. He painted a Young Jesus disputes doctors at the temple for the church in Bedizzole. A painter by the name Gallo Gallina (1796-1874) was active in Lombardy in the 19th century, but it is unclear if they are related.

Pastellist Anna Pasetti was active as a copyist in Gallina's studio.

References

A manuscripted unpublished biography about him has been written by father Marcantonio Paratico

1752 births
1787 deaths
18th-century Italian painters
Italian male painters
Painters from Brescia
Accademia di Belle Arti di Venezia alumni
18th-century Italian male artists